Rakiriri, also known as Goat Island and officially Goat Island/Rakiriri is the second largest island in Otago Harbour, in the South Island of New Zealand. It is located between Port Chalmers and Portobello, to the northeast of Dunedin's city centre.

Name
The dual name Goat Island / Rakiriri is the official name of the island. Rakiriri means "angry sky" or "angry Rakinui" in the southern dialect of Te Reo Māori. The name is also sometimes used to refer to the extinct Dunedin Volcano, of which Otago Harbour is the crater.

History
When the quarantine station was running, single men were quartered in a two storied barrack similar to those on Quarantine Island/Kamau Taurua. Unlike its neighbour, Goat Island / Rakiriri today is uninhabited, and is designated as a scenic reserve and Historic Area. It has been identified by BirdLife International as an Important Bird Area because it has a breeding colony of bronze shags.

Geography
The two islands, along with the Portobello Peninsula, are all part of a ridge (anticline) lying across the centre of the harbour, which was the crater of the long-extinct Dunedin volcano - running from Portobello to Port Chalmers.

See also 

 New Zealand outlying islands
 List of islands of New Zealand
 List of islands
 Desert island

References

Uninhabited islands of New Zealand
Islands of Otago
Important Bird Areas of New Zealand
Port Chalmers